This article discusses the geometric figure; for the science-fiction character see Spidron (character).

In geometry, a spidron is a continuous flat geometric figure composed entirely of triangles, where, for every pair of joining triangles, each has a leg of the other as one of its legs, and neither has any point inside the interior of the other.  A deformed spidron is a three-dimensional figure sharing the other properties of a specific spidron, as if that spidron were drawn on paper, cut out in a single piece, and folded along a number of legs.

Origin and development

It was first modelled in 1979 by Dániel Erdély, as a homework presented to Ernő Rubik, for Rubik's design class, at the Hungarian University of Arts and Design (now: Moholy-Nagy University of Art and Design). Erdély also gave the name "Spidron" to it, when he discovered it in the early 70s. The name originates from the English names of spider and spiral, because the shape is reminiscent of a spider web. The term ends with the affix "-on" as in polygon.

In his initial work Erdély started with a hexagon. He combined every corner with the after-next one. In his mathematical analysis of spidrons Stefan Stenzhorn demonstrated that it is possible to create a spidron with every regular Polygon greater than four. Furthermore, you can vary the number of points to the next combination. Stenzhorn reasoned that after all the initial hexagon-spidron is just the special case of a general spidron.

In a two-dimensional plane a tessellation with hexagon-spidrons is possible. The form is known from many works by M.C. Escher, who devoted himself to such bodies of high symmetry. Due to their symmetry spidrons are also an interesting object for mathematicians.

The spidrons can appear in a very large number of versions, and the different formations make possible the development of a great variety of plane, spatial and mobile applications. These developments are suitable to perform aesthetic and practical functions that are defined in advance by the consciously selected arrangements of all the possible characteristics of symmetry. The spidron system is under the protection of several know-how and industrial pattern patents; Spidron is a registered trademark. It was awarded a gold medal at the exhibition Genius Europe in 2005. It has been presented in a number of art magazines, conferences and international exhibitions. During the last two years it has also appeared, in several versions, as a public area work. Since spidron-system is the personal work by Dániel Erdély but in the development of the individual formations he worked together with several Hungarian, Dutch, Canadian and American colleagues, the exhibition is a collective product in a sense, several works and developments are a result of an international team-work.

The spidron is constructed from two semi-spidrons sharing a long side, with one rotated 180 degrees to the other. If the second semi-spidron is reflected in the long side instead of rotated, the result is a "hornflake". Deformed spidrons or hornflakes can be used to construct polyhedra called spidrohedra or hornhedra. Some of these polyhedra are space fillers.

A semi-spidron may have infinitely many triangles. Such spidronized polyhedra have infinitely many faces and are examples of apeirohedra.

Practical use
Considering the use of spidrons Daniel Erdély enumerated several possible applications:

See also
Triangle mesh
Triangle strip

References

External links
 'Spidron 3D' Google image search
 "Edanet", SpaceCollective.org
 
 
 The Pécs Exhibition on Spidron homepage

 Spidrons as playable art: Tulips, GamePuzzles.com

Geometric shapes
Iterated function system fractals
Triangles
Spirals